Hackney Wick Wolves speedway opened in 1935 at Hackney Wick Stadium, Waterden Road, London, and operated until the outbreak of World War II in 1939. Many years later the Hackney Hawks and Hackney Kestrels rode at Hackney Wick Stadium.

History
The Walthamstow Wolves closed at the end of the 1934 season and the team moved into Hackney Stadium. The first meeting was held on 26 April 1935 although the first official meeting was a week later on 3 May when Hackney lost to the New Cross Lambs in the National League.

On 15 May 1936, Hackney rider Dusty Haigh died from a broken skull in a crash at the track after falling whilst in the lead and being struck by another rider's machine.

Captain Dicky Case qualified for the first ever Speedway World Championship final at Wembley in 1936, but decided to retire at the end of the 1937 season.
 
Crowds were not large enough to support top level speedway so, in 1938, Hackney swapped licences with the Bristol Bulldogs and dropped down to the second tier. This meant the big name stars at the Wick went too. However, the Wolves won the 1938 Speedway National League Division Two that season.

Hackney stadium did not host speedway again immediately after the Second World War until 1963 when the Hackney Hawks were founded.

Season summary

Notable riders

See also
Hackney Hawks
Hackney Kestrels
London Lions

References 

Defunct British speedway teams
Sport in the London Borough of Hackney
History of the London Borough of Hackney
Sports venues completed in 1935
Sports clubs disestablished in 1939